American rapper Jay Rock has released three studio albums, 10 mixtapes, 12 singles (including six as a featured artist) and 30 music videos.

Albums

Studio albums

Mixtapes

Singles

As lead artist

As featured artist

Promotional singles

Other charted songs

Other guest appearances

Music video

As lead artist

As featured artist

See also
Black Hippy discography

Notes

References

 

Discographies of American artists
Hip hop discographies
Jay Rock albums